The National Lawn Tennis Championships of India originally called the All India Championships  or formally the All India Lawn Tennis Championships  and also known as the India National Championships was a defunct combined (men's and women's) tennis tournament. It was played from 1910 until 1999. It was held in various cities in, India and was played outdoor on multiple surfaces, but mainly grass courts.

Ramanathan Krishnan won most mens singles championships with eight wins overall, and, during the pre-Open era Jenny Sandison and Leela Row won the most women's singles championships with seven titles each, while Nirupama Mankad won the most titles during the open era with five titles.

History
Lawn tennis in India can be traced back within the first decade of the establishment of the Wimbledon championships with early local championships being established in places like Punjab (1885) and Calcutta (1887). However, there was no national championships, in 1910 colonial officers of the British Raj established the All India Lawn Tennis Championships in Allahabad which was 10 years before the All India Tennis Association was founded. The championships staged both men's and women's singles play and also doubles. In 1946, the All-India Championships tournament was renamed the National Lawn Tennis Championships of India by the India Lawn Tennis Association.

The tournament was hosted at different cities around India and was also played on different surfaces, such as grass courts (1910–59, 1964–66, 1969, 1970, 1973), hard courts (1967) and clay courts (1960–61, 1974–79). This tournament was also held in conjunction with the Northern India Championships for the years 1961 to 1967.

Finals
Incomplete roll included:

Men's singles

Women's singles

Venues
The tournament was staged in different cities for the duration of its run they included:

Records
Included:

Men's singles
Most titles:   Ramanathan Krishnan (8 titles)
Most finals:   Ramanathan Krishnan (10 finals)
Most consecutive titles:   Edward Vivian Bobb (3 titles) (1927–27, 1930)
Most consecutive finals:   Ramanathan Krishnan,  (4 finals) (1957–60)
Most matches played:  Vijay Amritraj (26) 
Most matches won:  Vijay Amritraj (24) 
Most consecutive matches won:   Edward Vivian Bobb (13)
Most editions played:   Premjit Lall (11) 
Best match winning %:   Edward Vivian Bobb, 92.8%, (pre-open era)
Best match winning %:  Vijay Amritraj, 92.3%, (open era)
Oldest champion:  Jack Arkinstall, 34y 7m & 26d (1954)
Youngest champion:   Ramanathan Krishnan, 16y 8m & 17d (1954)

Women's singles
Most titles Pre Open era:  Jenny Sandison/ Leela Row (7)
Most titles Open era:  Nirupama Mankad (5)

See also
 Indian Open

References

Sources
 
http://www.tennisarchives.com/All India Championships 1910–1956
https://app.thetennisbase.com/All India Championships draws 1910–1979

Grand Prix tennis circuit
Clay court tennis tournaments
Grass court tennis tournaments
Hard court tennis tournaments
Tennis tournaments in India
Defunct tennis tournaments in India
Defunct sports competitions in India
Recurring sporting events established in 1910
Recurring sporting events disestablished in 1982
1910 establishments in India
1982 disestablishments in India